Béla Varga may refer to:

 Béla Varga (wrestler) (1888–1969), Hungarian Olympic wrestler
 Béla Varga (politician) (1903–1995), Hungarian Catholic priest and politician